Doble Kara ( / English: Double Kara) is a Philippine melodrama television series, directed by Emmanuel Q. Palo, Trina N. Dayrit, and Jojo A. Saguin, which premiered on ABS-CBN's Kapamilya Gold afternoon block and worldwide on The Filipino Channel on August 24, 2015 to February 10, 2017, starring Julia Montes. The series revolves around identical twin sisters, Kara and Sara, who grew up in a happy family in spite of being poor and whose lives will be intertwined because of love, identity, deceit, ambition, and wealth when destiny teasingly compels to separate their lives.

Episodes have been broadcast on Mondays to Fridays at 3:20 p.m. Philippine Standard Time (PST), since Doble Kara third season's second half and fourth season. The first three seasons aired after It's Showtime every weekdays at 3:00 p.m. and 2:45 p.m. PST time slot. All episodes are approximately thirty minutes, excluding commercials, and are broadcast in both high-definition and standard. 

The first book initially had an order of two seasons, but ABS-CBN ordered an additional full season for the series' first book after the first few episodes of its two seasons aired and were the top series debut. On April 22, 2016, ABS-CBN announced that the show was renewed for a fourth season, introducing its second book. As of February 10, 2017, 381 episodes of Doble Kara have aired, concluding its series run.

Series overview

Episodes

Book 1: Season 1 (2015)

Book 1: Season 2 (2015–16)

Book 1: Season 3 (2016)

Book 2: Season 4 (2016)

Book 2: Season 5 (2016–17)

Book 2: Season 6 (2017)

References

External links
 

	

Doble Kara
Lists of Philippine drama television series episodes

Lists of soap opera episodes